Geumbungeo (금붕어) (Goldfish) is a 1927 Korean silent film. The silent, black-and-white film was directed, edited by and starred Na Woon-gyu (1902-1937).

Sources

See also
 List of Korean-language films
 Cinema of Korea

1927 films
Pre-1948 Korean films
Korean silent films
Korean black-and-white films
Films directed by Na Woon-gyu